Megachile armenia is a species of bee in the family Megachilidae. It was described by Tkalcu in 1992.

References

Armenia
Insects described in 1992